SourceLair is an Online IDE (integrated development environment) that lets you code in more than 25 programming languages and frameworks, while it integrates with Git, GitHub and Heroku.

Features
Code in the browser.

See also
Django (web framework)
Online integrated development environment
Online Javascript IDE
Comparison of source code editors

References

External links 
SourceLair Chrome App

Integrated development environments
Online integrated development environments